F18, F-18 or F.XVIII may refer to:
 McDonnell Douglas F/A-18 Hornet, an American all-weather carrier-capable multirole fighter jet
 Boeing F/A-18E/F Super Hornet, more advanced derivative of the F/A-18 Hornet
 F-18 (Michigan county highway)
 Fokker F.XVIII, a 1932 Dutch airliner 
 , a 1937 British Royal Navy Tribal-class destroyer
 Formula 18, a class of catamaran
 Fluorine-18 (F-18 or F18F), an unstable isotope of fluorine
 Slip F-18, anchorage for the fictional houseboat The Busted Flush

See also 
 The ICD-10 chapter V code for "Mental and behavioural disorders due to use of volatile solvents"